Staphylus of Naucratis was an ancient Greek historian, geographer and mythographer quoted by Strabo (x. p. 475), Pliny (H. N. v. 31), and Athenaeus (ii. p. 45, c.), as well as by the scholiasts. He wrote a work on Thessaly (Schol. ad Apoll Rhod. iv. 816 ; Harpocrat. s. v. penestae ; Schol. ad Aristoph. Nub. 1064), on Aeolia, Attica (Harpocration. s.v epiboion pronaia ), and on Arcadia (Sext. Empir. adv. Math. 116).

References

Ancient Greek historians known only from secondary sources
Naucratians
Ancient Greek mythographers
Ancient Greek geographers